The National Heart Foundation of New Zealand (known as the Heart Foundation) is a registered New Zealand heart health charity established in 1968. It funds research into heart disease, and provides education to promote healthy lifestyles to prevent heart disease. It has awarded over $78 million to fund research and specialist training for cardiologists since 1970. The funding has provided over 1,800 research and training grants awarded in New Zealand.

There are 18 Heart Foundation branches located through New Zealand.

The Heart Foundation's work includes:
 funding research into the treatment, cure and prevention of heart disease
 funding training and grants for New Zealand’s cardiologists and researchers
 developing and implementing heart disease prevention programmes for schools and communities
 educating New Zealanders on how to live heart healthy lifestyles
 championing care for those at risk of, or living with, heart disease in New Zealand

History 
In 1968, a group of cardiologists established the National Heart Foundation with the aim of making an impact on New Zealand's heart disease epidemic. New Zealand's death rates due to heart disease were among the highest in the world at the time.

Research 
The Heart Foundation is New Zealand's leading independent funder of heart research. Their funding enables medical researchers and cardiologists to undertake research projects and specialist training.

Heart Foundation Chair of Heart Health 
Heart Foundation donors funded a Chair of Heart Health position at Auckland University. The Chair, filled by Professor Rob Doughty, was established to create a research hub to focus on improving understanding of heart disease, and to help improve heart health for New Zealanders.

Heart disease and mental illness study 
In 2017 the Heart Foundation funded a two-year study into the link between heart disease and mental illness, to be carried out by Professor Bart Ellenbroek and his research team at Victoria University, Wellington.

Polypill study 
The Heart Foundation of New Zealand, with other organisations including the British Heart Foundation and the Wellcome Trust, funded research published in 2011 into the use of a polypill to reduce the risk of heart attack and stroke.

Care and support 
The Heart Foundation holds heart-help sessions that offer support and advice from guest speakers including health professionals. These sessions are run by regionally-based Heart Foundation staff.

Heart Foundation lottery 
The Heart Foundation runs a lottery as a fundraiser. It began on 26 December 1993. Jennian Homes is the partner of the Heart Foundation Lottery.

Heart Foundation Tick 
The Heart Foundation Tick programme was used to help New Zealanders find healthy food choices. The programme ran for 25 years and was retired in 2016. An achievement of the Tick programme was its success in working with food companies to reduce the amount of salt in processed food products.

References

External links 
 Heart Foundation website

Charities based in New Zealand
Heart disease organizations
Health charities
1968 establishments in New Zealand
Organizations established in 1968